Amazonas 1 or Hispasat 55W-1 was a communications satellite based on the Eurostar 3000 satellite bus and owned by satellites operator Hispasat, based in Madrid, Spain. It was launched on 5 August 2004, with a launch mass of 4,5 ton, on a Proton-M Briz-M launcher to be located in the 61º W geostationary position.

Amazonas 1 payloads were 36 Ku band transponders that provided communications services in Europe and America, and 27 C band transponders that provided services in America. In 2013 it was relocated to the 36º W position and replaced by Amazonas 3.

In March 2016, Hispasat announced that Amazonas 1 would be renamed as Hispasat 55W-1. Finally, the satellite was moved to a graveyard orbit and deactivated on 23 June 2017.

References

External links 
 Official website
 Amazonas 1

Spacecraft launched in 2004
Communications satellites
Communications satellites in geostationary orbit
2004 in Spain
Satellites of Spain
Satellites using the Eurostar bus